Alexander Chalmers (1645–1703), born in Dyce, Grampian, Scotland, was a Scottish resident of the Polish city of Warsaw in the 17th Century. He served as a judge in the city and was four times mayor in 1691, 1694, 1696 and 1702, He is commemorated by a plaque erected in his honour on his former house at the corner of Wąski and Szeroki Dunaj (now housing the Leathercraft Museum). He arrived in Poland around 1676 and died in 1703.

References

Scottish emigrants to Poland
1645 births
1703 deaths
Mayors of Warsaw
Politicians from Aberdeen
16th-century Scottish people
16th-century Polish people